CIVI-DT (channel 53) is a television station in Victoria, British Columbia, Canada, part of the CTV 2 system. It is owned and operated by Bell Media alongside Vancouver-based CTV station CIVT-DT, channel 32 (although the two stations maintain separate operations). CIVI-DT's studios are located at the corner of Broad Street and Pandora Avenue across from the McPherson Playhouse and the Victoria City Hall in downtown Victoria, and its transmitter is located near Rockland. The station operates a rebroadcaster (CIVI-DT-2) on virtual and UHF channel 17 in Vancouver, with transmitter atop Mount Seymour in the district municipality of North Vancouver.

History
At the end of the 1990s, CHUM Limited only owned terrestrial television stations in the province of Ontario. Similarly, Craig Media only had stations in provinces within the Canadian Prairies. Both companies looked to expand their national presence, and both submitted a bid when the CRTC issued a call for applications for a new television station licence in Victoria; CHUM was awarded the licence in 2000. CIVI first signed on the air on October 4, 2001, as CHUM's first original station to be part of the NewNet television system. Their studios, dubbed "Pandora's Box" for its location on Pandora Avenue, had previously been the home of the Brackman-Ker Milling Company and other uses over the years; CHUM spent over $20 million restoring it, including outfitting the building with the latest in technology and bringing it up to seismic standards.

Known on the air as "The New VI", the station started off with much pomp and circumstance, marking their launch with a street party around their studios in Victoria and around their Nanaimo bureau. It boasted a large lineup of personalities, including former British Columbia New Democratic Party cabinet minister Moe Sihota. Original programming included Island Underground (focusing on Vancouver Island's youth culture), The New Canoe (hosted by and produced for the area's First Nations residents), Environ-Mental (focusing on localized environmental issues), the VI Parade (handling local arts and culture), and a localized version of Speaker's Corner; much of the launch schedule consisted of programming from other CHUM outlets (including CityLine, FashionTelevision and Ed the Sock's Night Party), some of which had previously aired across the border on KVOS-TV in Bellingham, WA (which CHUM had been syndicating programming to since the 1990s in the face of repeated failures to launch a station in the area), along with American imported and syndicated programming (including The Tonight Show with Jay Leno and the Star Trek franchise), and a primetime movie on Sundays dubbed The Great MoVI (in the style of Citytv's Great Movies).

However, the station wound up launching amid a massive TV realignment in the Vancouver market, and ultimately their launch was delayed from September to October; the various changes also meant that KVOS was displaced by CIVI from its long-time home on channel 12 on many Vancouver-area cable systems. The station also struggled to compete against CH owned-and-operated station CHEK-TV (channel 6, now an independent station), which had been the only local station on Vancouver Island for more than four decades. Gradually, personalities from the original roster were replaced by new faces, and some were let go without replacements. Not long after launch, CHUM purchased CKVU in Vancouver and converted it into the Citytv station for the region, meaning CIVI became part of a twinstick; as per CRTC regulations regarding twinsticks, CKVU was prohibited from airing more than 10% of the programming aired on CIVI, and newscasts were required to be separately managed.

As A-Channel Victoria

The station was rebranded as "A-Channel" on August 2, 2005, along with the rest of the NewNet system. The station would likely have been part of the original A-Channel system at its launch had Craig Media won the licence in 2000. On July 12, 2006, CTVglobemedia announced plans to purchase CHUM Limited, with the intention of divesting the A-Channel stations. On that same day it was also announced that the morning news program A-Channel Morning would be discontinued, although this decision was supposedly unrelated to the takeover by CTVglobemedia (CIVI later restored a morning program to its schedule in the fall of 2007).

Rogers Communications announced a deal to buy A-Channel on April 9, 2007; however, given the conditions of approval for the sale of CHUM on June 8, 2007, Rogers acquired the Citytv system instead, while CTV kept A-Channel. CTVglobemedia became the official owner of CIVI on June 22, 2007.

As A Vancouver Island

The A-Channel system and Atlantic Canada's ASN was rebranded as A on August 11, 2008, with CIVI becoming branded as "A Vancouver Island". As a result, CIVI's newscasts were rebranded as A News on that date, although the station's employees had been using that title for a couple of months prior to the relaunch; the station also began producing a morning newscast (under the title A Morning) on September 8, 2008, but was later cancelled on March 4, 2009, due to economic issues. The program was later replaced with a simulcast of the morning show from sister radio station CFAX (1070 AM).

CTV Two/CTV 2 Vancouver Island
As part of Bell Media's May 30, 2011 announcement of the rebranding of the A television stations to the CTV Two brand, CIVI became branded as "CTV Two Vancouver Island" on August 29, 2011. As a result, CIVI's newscasts were rebranded as CTV News on that same date.

News operation

CIVI presently broadcasts 13 hours of locally produced newscasts each week (with 2 hours each weekday and a half-hour each on Saturdays and Sundays). The station does not air local news on the weekends; the station did not carry an 11:00 p.m. newscast on weekend evenings, and its weekend 6:00 p.m. newscasts were cancelled as of February 3, 2021 due to budget cuts made by Bell Media.

At launch, the station's newscast was dubbed VILand News (sister station CKVR had originally used a similar title, VRLand News, for their first few years as a NewNet station); the station's news anchors walked around the studio instead of sitting behind a desk, mimicking the format used at Toronto sister station CITY-TV and other NewNet outlets. VILand News consisted of a 90-minute long evening newscast from 5:30 to 7:00 p.m. and a half-hour late newscast at 11:00 p.m., as well as the two-hour morning newscast New Day (initially broadcast from the station's Nanaimo facilities with Bruce Williams). Weatherman and local folk musician Tony Latimer delivered his forecasts from his own sailboat, the Forbes and Cameron, which was equipped with an omni-directional microwave transmitter so Tony could broadcast from Victoria's Inner Harbour or other offshore locations.

To combat the station's low ratings, the evening news block was also repeatedly modified, being split into three different shows (VILand Live at 5:30, VILand Voices at 6:00 and VILand News at 6:30) in January 2002. By 2004, CHUM higher-ups, in hopes of stemming the station's financial losses and low ratings, hired longtime CHEK anchor Hudson Mack as its new chief anchor and news director. Changes were introduced to the station's newscasts such as the introduction of a desk for the anchors; these changes appeared to have been effective. While still trailing CHEK, the ratings gap between the two has been narrowed.

Since Mack's arrival, the station has been honoured with a number of industry awards. In 2006, it received three Edward R. Murrow Awards from the Radio-Television News Directors Association International, for Best Newscast, Best Investigative Reporting and Best Sports Reporting. It was the second straight year the station won Murrows for its newscast and investigative reporting. In 2005, the station won eight industry awards, including two Edward R. Murrow Awards from RTNDA International, for Best Newscast and Best Investigative Reporting; and top news honours from the British Columbia Association of Broadcasters.

Notable former on-air staff
Moe Sihota – political commentator (former president of the British Columbia New Democratic Party)

Technical information

Subchannel

Analogue-to-digital conversion

CIVI shut down its analogue signal, over UHF channel 53, on August 31, 2011, the official date in which Canadian television stations in CRTC-designated mandatory markets transitioned from analogue to digital broadcasts. The station's digital signal remained on its pre-transition UHF channel 23. Through the use of PSIP, digital television receivers display CIVI-DT's virtual channel as its analogue-era UHF channel 53, which was among the high band UHF channels (52–69) that were removed from broadcasting use as a result of the transition.

References

External links
CTV 2 Vancouver Island
Canadian Communications Foundation – CIVI-DT History

IVI-DT
Television channels and stations established in 2001
IVI-DT
Mass media in Victoria, British Columbia
2001 establishments in British Columbia